Çiftlikdere can refer to:

 Çiftlikdere, Çanakkale
 Çiftlikdere, Savaştepe